Double, Double You is an album by Kenny Wheeler featuring performances by Wheeler with Mike Brecker, John Taylor, Dave Holland and Jack DeJohnette. The album was recorded in 1983 and released on the ECM label.

Reception 
The Allmusic review by Scott Yanow states "Kenny Wheeler's string of ECM recordings are all quite rewarding, generally avoiding the ECM stereotype of introspective long tones and silence... A generally memorable outing". In the view of Los Angeles Times reviewer Leonard Feather, writing shortly after the album's release, Wheeler's LP was just one extraneous drum solo away from a perfect 5-star rating.
With Michael Brecker on tenor sax and a rhythm section that is powerful both individually and collectively, he has produced a provocative and often stimulating set of six original works. The horns' interplay on "Three for D'reen," Holland's phenomenal solo on "Blue for Lou" and all five men on the 14-minute "Foxy Trot" share the credit. This could have been a five-star set, but lapses into one of those inevitable closing drum solos. Why? Why? 4 stars.

Track listing
All compositions by Kenny Wheeler

 "Foxy Trot" - 14:08
 "Ma Bel" - 3:54
 "W.W." - 7:51
 "Three for D'reen/Blue for Lou/Mark Time" - 23:26

Personnel 
 Kenny Wheeler – trumpet, flugelhorn
 Mike Brecker – tenor saxophone
 John Taylor – piano
 Dave Holland – bass
 Jack DeJohnette – drums

References 

Kenny Wheeler albums
1984 albums
ECM Records albums
Albums produced by Manfred Eicher